The 1992 Cheltenham Council election took place on 7 May 1992 to elect members of Cheltenham Borough Council in Gloucestershire, England. One third of the council was up for election and, despite Conservative gains, the Liberal Democrats stayed in overall control of the council.

After the election, the composition of the council was
Liberal Democrat 22
Conservative 12
Labour 3
People Against Bureaucracy 3
Independent 1

Election result

Ward results

References

Cheltenham
Cheltenham Borough Council elections
1990s in Gloucestershire